Francis Bede Smith (28 February 1886 – 29 October 1954) was an Australian rugby union player who competed in the 1908 Summer Olympics. Smith, a centre, was born in Wellington, New South Wales and claimed a total of 4 international rugby caps for Australia. His debut game was against New Zealand, at Dunedin, on 2 September 1905.

He was a member of the Australian rugby union team, which won the gold medal.

See also
 Rugby union at the 1908 Summer Olympics

References

External links
 
 
 
 

1886 births
1954 deaths
Australian rugby union players
Australia international rugby union players
Rugby union players at the 1908 Summer Olympics
Olympic rugby union players of Australasia
Olympic gold medalists for Australasia
Medalists at the 1908 Summer Olympics
Rugby union centres
Rugby union players from New South Wales